The Rainbow Swash is the common name for an untitled work by Corita Kent in the Dorchester neighborhood of Boston, Massachusetts. Highly visible from daily commuters' drives on Interstate 93, it is considered one of the major landmarks of Boston, akin to the Citgo sign.

Description 
Originally created in 1971, the Rainbow Swash comprises large streaks of rainbow colors over a natural gas storage tank on Dorchester's waterfront, located about two miles (3 km) south of Downtown Boston.  The landmark  design is highly visible from the Southeast Expressway and passed by hundreds of thousands of commuters daily. The design was transferred to its present location in 1992
when the original LNG tank was torn down.

History 
In 1971, then–Boston Gas Company president Eli Goldston commissioned Corita Kent to paint the Rainbow Swash design on one of two adjacent LNG tanks facing Boston's Southeast Expressway.

Since the 1970s, the Rainbow Swash has been controversial. The mural was criticized as purportedly featuring a profile of Vietnamese Leader Ho Chi Minh's face in its blue stripe.  Kent was a peace activist, and some believe she was protesting the Vietnam War, but Kent herself always denied embedding such a profile. In 1992, the original rainbow-painted LNG tank was torn down and the Rainbow Swash was recreated on the adjacent tank despite objections from veterans groups. However, the blue stripe is less pronounced in the 1992 reproduction.  Less controversially, the yellow stripe is said to resemble the profile of Fred Flintstone looking southward.

In 2000, Boston Gas was acquired by Keyspan and the Keyspan logo replaced the Boston Gas logo under the rainbow. Keyspan was acquired and merged into National Grid plc and the National Grid logo was placed over the Keyspan logo in September 2007.

Controversy
A noted photographer, James Prigoff, ended up in a United States Department of Homeland Security database after photographing the Rainbow Swash. The ACLU of California is currently suing the Federal Government calling into question the legality of the Suspicious Activity Reporting program which was used to report the photographer. In February 2019 the Ninth Court of Appeals affirmed an earlier finding for the government.

Notable appearances
The Swash appeared in the opening credits to the 2005 film Fever Pitch.

References

External links 
Artist Information: Corita Kent 
"WGBH switches on digital mural at new Brighton digs" by Donna Goodison, Boston Herald (Sept. 17, 2007)
The Ho Chi Minh Memorial Gas Tank at Boston Online

1971 paintings
Culture of Boston
Dorchester, Boston
Landmarks in Dorchester, Boston
Murals in Massachusetts
Art in Massachusetts
Rainbows in art